Algerian Arabic, natively known as ,  or , is a dialect derived from the form of Arabic spoken in Algeria. It belongs to the Maghrebi Arabic language continuum and is partially mutually intelligible with Tunisian and Moroccan.

Like other varieties of Maghrebi Arabic, Algerian has a mostly Semitic vocabulary. It contains Berber, Punic and Latin (African Romance) influences and has some loanwords from French, Andalusian Arabic, Ottoman Turkish and Spanish. Algerian Arabic contains a few Berber loanwords which represent 8% to 9% of its vocabulary.

Use 
Algerian Arabic is the native dialect of 75% to 80% of Algerians and is mastered by 85% to 100% of them. It is a spoken language used in daily communication and entertainment, while Modern Standard Arabic (MSA) is generally reserved for official use and education. As in the rest of the Arab world, this linguistic situation has been described as diglossia: MSA is nobody's first acquired language; it is learned through formal instruction rather than transmission from parent to child.

Besides informal communication, Algerian Arabic is rarely written. In 2008, The Little Prince was translated in Algerian Arabic. The first novel written in Algerian Arabic is published by Rabeh Sebaa in 2021 and is entitled Fahla (in Latin script and Arabic characters).

Dialects
The Algerian language includes several distinct dialects belonging to two genetically different groups: pre-Hilalian and Hilalian dialects.

Hilalian dialects
Hilalian dialects of Algeria belong to three linguistic groups:
Eastern Hilal dialects: spoken in the Hautes Plaines around Sétif, M'Sila and Djelfa; 
Central Hilal dialects: of central and southern Algeria, south of Algiers and Oran;
Mâqil dialects: spoken in the western part of Oranais (noted for the third singular masculine accusative pronoun h, for example,  (I saw him), which would be  in other dialects).

Modern koine languages, urban and national, are based mainly on Hilalian dialects.

Pre-Hilalian dialects
Pre-Hilalian Arabic dialects are generally classified into three types: Urban, "Village" Sedentary, and Jewish dialects. Several Pre-Hilalian dialects are spoken in Algeria:
Urban dialects can be found in all of Algeria's big cities. Urban dialects were formerly also spoken in other cities, such as Azemmour and Mascara, Algeria, where they are no longer used.
The Jijel Arabic (or Jijeli Dialect) is spoken in the triangular area north of Constantine, including Collo and Jijel (it is noteworthy for its pronunciation of [q] as [k] and [t] as [ts] and characterized, such as other Eastern pre-Hilalian dialects, by the preservation of the three short vowels).
The traras-Msirda dialect is spoken in the area north of Tlemcen, including the eastern Traras, Rachgoun and Honaine (it is noted for its pronunciation of [q] as [k]) ;
Judeo-Algerian Arabic is no longer spoken after Jews left Algeria in 1962, following its independence.

Phonology

Consonants 

This conservatism concerning pronunciation is in contrast to Algerian Arabic grammar which has shifted noticeably.

 The voiceless "Ch" (t͡ʃ) is used in some words in the Algerian dialect like ""  (orange) or ""  (A kind of Algerian sweet) but remains rare.

Dissimilation 
Thus  (earthquake) has become , conversely  "mutton" becomes .

Assimilation 
The same study also noted numerous examples of assimilation in Northwestern Algerian Arabic, due to the large consonant clusters created from all of the historical vowel deletion: examples include  "chicken", becoming  and  "good", becoming .

Vowels 

Also notable among the differences between Classical Arabic and Algerian Arabic is the deletion of short vowels entirely from open syllables and thus word final positions, which creates a stark distinction between written Classical Arabic, and casually written Algerian Arabic.

Grammar

Nouns and adjectives

Conjunctions and prepositions

Some of them can be attached to the noun, just like in other Arabic dialects. The word for in, "fi", can be attached to a definite noun. For example, the word for a house has a definite form "ed-dar"  but with "fi", it becomes "fed-dar".

Gender
Algerian Arabic uses two genders for words: masculine and feminine. Masculine nouns and adjectives generally end with a consonant while the feminine nouns generally end with an a.

Examples:
 "a donkey",  "a female donkey".

Pluralisation
Hilalian dialects, on which the modern koine is based, often use regular plural while the wider use of the broken plural is characteristic to pre-Hilalian dialects.

The regular masculine plural is formed with the suffix -in, which derives from the Classical Arabic genitive and accusative ending -īna rather than the nominative -ūna:
mumen (believer) → mumnin 
For feminine nouns, the regular plural is obtained by suffixing -at: 
 Classical Arabic: bint (girl) → banat
 Algerian Arabic: bent → bnat

The broken plural can be found for some plurals in Hilalian dialects, but it is mainly used, for the same words, in pre-Hilalian dialects:
 Broken plural: ṭabla → ṭwabəl.

Article 
The article el is indeclinable and expresses a definite state of a noun of any gender and number. It is also prefixed to each of that noun's modifying adjectives.

It follows the solar letters and lunar letters rules of Classical Arabic: if the word starts with one of these consonants, el is assimilated and replaced by the first consonant:

Examples:

rajel → er-rajel "man" (assimilation)
qeṭṭ → el-qeṭṭ "cat" (no assimilation)

Important Notes:

 When it is after lunar letters  consonant we add the article le-.

Examples:

qmer → le-qmer "moon"
ḥjer → le-ḥjer "stone"

 We always use the article el with the words that begin with vowels.

Examples:

alf → el-alf "thousand"

Verbs
Verbs are conjugated by adding affixes (prefixes, postfixes, both or none) that change according to the tense.

In all Algerian Arabic dialects, there is no gender differentiation of the second and third person in the plural forms, nor is there gender differentiation of the second person in the singular form in pre-Hilalian dialects. Hilalian dialects preserve the gender differentiation of the singular second person.

Example with the verb kteb "To write":

Future tense
Speakers generally do not use the future tense above. Used instead is the present tense or present continuous.

Also, as is used in all of the other Arabic dialects, there is another way of showing active tense. The form changes the root verb into an adjective. For example, "kteb" he wrote becomes "kateb".

Negation

Like all North African Arabic varieties (including Egyptian Arabic) along with some Levantine Arabic varieties, verbal expressions are negated by enclosing the verb with all its affixes, along with any adjacent pronoun-suffixed preposition, within the  circumfix ma ...-š:
« lεebt » ("I played") → « ma lεebt-š   » ("I didn't play")
« ma tṭabbaεni-š » ("Don't push me")
« ma yṭawlu-l-ek-š hadu le-qraεi » ("Those bottles won't last you long")
« ma sibt-š plaṣa » ("I couldn't get a seat / parking place")

Other negative words (walu, etc.) are used in combination with  ma to express more complex types of negation.
 is not used when other negative words are used
ma qult walu ("I didn't say anything")
ma šuft tta waḥed ("I didn't see anyone")
or when two verbs are consecutively in the negative
ma šuft ma smeεt ("I neither saw nor did I hear").

Verb derivation
Verb derivation is done by adding affixes or by doubling consonants, there are two types of derivation forms: causative, passive.

Causative: is obtained by doubling consonants :
xrej "to go out" → xerrej "to make to go out"
dxel "to enter" →  "to make to enter, to introduce".

Passive:It is obtained by prefixing the verb with t- / tt- / tn- / n- :
qtel "to kill" → tneqtel "to be killed"
šreb "to drink" → tnešreb "to be drunk".

The adverbs of location 
Things could be in three places hnaya (right here), hna (here) or el-hih (there).

Pronouns

Personal pronouns 
Most Algerian Arabic dialects have eight personal pronouns since they no longer have gender differentiation of the second and third person in the plural forms. However, pre-Hilalian dialects retain seven personal pronouns since gender differentiation of the second person in the singular form is absent as well.

Example: « ḥatta ana/ana tani. » — "Me too."

Example: « Rani hna. » — "I'm here." and « Waš rak. » "How are you." to both males and females.

Possessive pronouns 

Dar means house.

Example :
« dar-na. » — "Our house" (House-our) Possessives are frequently combined with taε "of, property" : dar taε-na — "Our house.", dar taε-kum ...etc.

Singular:

taε-i = my or mine

taε-ek = your or yours (m, f)

taε-u = his
 
taε-ha = hers

Plural:

taε-na = our or ours

taε-kum = your or yours (m, f)

taε-hum = their or theirs (m, f)

"Our house" can be Darna or Dar taε-na, which is more like saying 'house of ours'. Taε can be used in other ways just like in English in Spanish. You can say Dar taε khuya, which means 'house of my brother' or 'my brother's house'.

Interrogative pronouns

Verbal pronouns 

Examples:

 « šuft-ni. » — "You saw me." (You.saw-me)
 « qetl-u. » — "He killed him." (He.killed-him)
 « kla-h. » — "He ate it." (He.ate-it)

Demonstratives 
Unlike Classical Arabic, Algerian Arabic has no dual and uses the plural instead. The demonstrative (Hadi) is also used for "it is".

Sample text
Auguste Moulieras's Les fourberies de si Djeh'a. The text below was translated from Kabyle language.

French loanwords  

Algerian Arabic contains numerous French loanwords.

(v)=verb

See also

 Varieties of Arabic
 Maghrebi Arabic
 Moroccan Arabic
 Tunisian Arabic
 Hassaniya Arabic
 Libyan Arabic
 Languages of Algeria

References

 
Languages of Algeria
Arabic languages
Maghrebi Arabic